Ulmo Shannon "Sonny" Randle Jr. (January 6, 1936 – May 23, 2017) was an American sportscaster and football player and coach. He played wide receiver in the National Football League (NFL) for the Chicago Cardinals/St. Louis Cardinals, San Francisco 49ers and Dallas Cowboys. Randle played college football at the University of Virginia.

Early years
Randle attended Fork Union Military Academy during his elementary and high school years. He focused on track and field, competing in different events and clocking 9.8 seconds in the 100-yard dash in 1954, which was a school record that stood until 1982, earning him All-American honors and an invitation to the U.S. Olympic Trials. Randle held the school record in the 400 metres (50.8 seconds) from 1954 until 1960. In the 200 metres, he ranked second in school history until 1955. Randle achieved these records on cinder tracks, instead of the faster modern synthetic tracks.

Randle did not play football until his senior year, because his athletic director Gus Lacy (who also served as his guardian) feared he would get hurt. Randle fractured his clavicle in his third game. He also practiced basketball. Randle had the distinction of attending Fork Union Military Academy as a cadet for the longest time (over twelve years).

College career
VMI offered Randle a scholarship, but he did not adapt and returned home before the end of his first year. He decided to walk-on to the University of Virginia and eventually earned a football scholarship.

In Randle's first two seasons, he did not have an impact, because he played as a wingback in the team's run-oriented offense. In 1957, as the offense began changing into more of an open passing attack, he ranked second on the team with 14 receptions for 168 yards. In 1958, Randle finished second in the NCAA with 47 receptions and first in kickoff returns (24.1 ypr). He posted 47 receptions for 642 yards, 1,253 all-purpose yards, 506 kickoff yards and 5 touchdowns.

In college, Randle also practiced basketball (one season) and track (four seasons), where he set a record by running the 100-yard dash in 9.6 seconds. He ran the 220-yard dash in 20.7 seconds.

In 1991, Randle was inducted into the Virginia Sports Hall of Fame.

Professional career

Chicago/St. Louis Cardinals
Randle was selected by the Chicago Cardinals in the 19th round (218th overall) of the 1958 NFL Draft, with a future draft pick, which allowed the team to draft him before his college eligibility was over.

In 1959, although he was one of the fastest players in the league as a rookie, he had trouble adapting to the professional game, registering only 15 receptions, but veteran defensive backs Dick 'Night Train' Lane and Jimmy Hill taught him how to get open.

In only his second season in the NFL, Randle had a break-out year registering 62 receptions (second on the league) for 893 yards and 15 touchdowns (led the league) and was named first-team All-Pro by the Associated Press (AP), The Sporting News and UPI.

In 1961, his numbers fell with Sam Etcheverry at quarterback, posting 44 receptions for 591 yards and 9 touchdowns. The next year Charley Johnson took over at quarterback and he finished with 63 receptions (second on the league) for 1,158 yards (second on the league), with an 18.4 average per reception and 7 touchdowns.

On November 4, 1962, Randle had at the time the second best game statistically by a wide receiver in NFL history as he caught 16 passes for 256 yards in a game against the New York Giants. He finished the season with 63 receptions for 1,158 yards, 8 touchdown catches and was named second-team All-Pro by UPI.

Randle once again passed the 1,000-yard receiving mark in 1963, finishing with 51 receptions for 1,014 yards and 12 touchdowns (fourth on the league).

In 1964, he suffered a serious shoulder separation and was lost for the season after the seventh game. At the time he was on pace for third straight 1,000-yard season.

In 1966, he was limited with a fractured hand and although he didn't miss any games, he only recorded 17 receptions for 218 yards and 2 touchdowns.

On September 14, 1967, after drafting wide receiver Dave Williams in the first round, the Cardinals traded him to the San Francisco 49ers in exchange for a second round draft choice (#42-Bob Atkins). He left the Cardinals as the franchise's second all-time leading wide receiver. In 1988, he was named to the All-time Cardinal Team.

San Francisco 49ers
In 1967, he appeared in 14 games (10 starts), registering 33 receptions for 502 yards and 4 touchdowns. In 1968, he was released after playing in 3 games on October 11.

Dallas Cowboys
On October 16, 1968, he was signed by the Dallas Cowboys for depth purposes. He appeared in 6 games as a reserve and had one reception for 12 yards. On July 16, 1969, he was traded to the Washington Redskins.

Washington Redskins
In 1969, he was acquired by the Washington Redskins and was moved to tight end under head coach Vince Lombardi. He was injured in a preseason game and was released on September 16.

Randle finished his career with 65 touchdown receptions in 120 games, currently placing him 12th on the NFL's all-time TD-per-game list (minimum 60 TDs). His 65 TD catches were also the most in the NFL during the 1960s; Don Maynard caught 84 and Lance Alworth caught 77 in the American Football League (AFL).

Coaching career
In 1961, Bing Devine the general manager of baseball's St. Louis Cardinals, asked him to work with his players on improving their running technique, for which future Hall of Famer Lou Brock gave him credit for his success stealing bases.

In 1970, he became an assistant coach at East Carolina University and was a part a of the coaching staff during the 17–14 win against Marshall University, which would later be involved in a plane crash on the way home, that killed 75 people: 37 football players, five coaches, two athletic trainers, the athletic director, 25 boosters, and a plane crew of five. He became the Pirates' head coach in 1971, leading the team to back-to-back Southern Conference championships in 1972 and 1973. He was named the conference's coach of the year in both years.

He then spent two years as head coach at his alma mater, the University of Virginia (1974–1975), two seasons at Massanutten Military Academy (1976–1977) as head football coach and athletic director, and five seasons at Marshall University (1979–1983) as the football head coach.

In 2009, he was inducted into the East Carolina Athletics Hall of Fame.

Broadcasting career
In the 1960s, Randle began his broadcasting while still playing for the Cardinals. In the mid-1980s, he was active in sports broadcasting, participating in radio broadcasts of college football games as a color commentator in St. Louis, Virginia and West Virginia. In 1991, Randle started S-R Sports, a syndicated talk radio network based in Virginia. He retired from broadcasting in 2014.

Head coaching record

College

Personal life
On May 23, 2017, he died at the age of 81 after a period of declining health.

See also
 List of NCAA major college yearly punt and kickoff return leaders

References

External links
 Virginia Sports Hall of Fame profile
 

1936 births
2017 deaths
American football wide receivers
Chicago Cardinals players
Dallas Cowboys players
East Carolina Pirates football coaches
Marshall Thundering Herd football coaches
San Francisco 49ers players
St. Louis Cardinals (football) players
Virginia Cavaliers football coaches
Virginia Cavaliers football players
High school football coaches in Virginia
Eastern Conference Pro Bowl players
People from Fluvanna County, Virginia
Players of American football from Virginia